Harpalus kazanensis is a species of ground beetle in the subfamily Harpalinae. It was described by Jedlicka in 1958.

References

kazanensis
Beetles described in 1958